Spyridium buxifolium is a species of flowering plant in the family Rhamnaceae and is endemic to New South Wales. It is a spreading shrub with egg-shaped to elliptic leaves, and heads of white, softly-hairy flowers with brown bracts at the base of the heads.

Description
The upper surface of the leaves is dark green and the lower surfaces in usually covered with greyish, woolly hairs. Flowering mostly occurs in winter and spring.

Taxonomy
This species was first formally described in 1837 by Eduard Fenzl who gave it the name Cryptandra buxifolia in Stephan Endlicher's Enumeratio plantarum quas in Novae Hollandiae ora austro-occidentali ad fluvium Cygnorum et in sinu Regis Georgii collegit Carolus Liber Baro de Hügel, of specimens collected by Allan Cunningham. In 2004, Kevin Thiele changed the name to Spyridium buxifolium in the journal Telopea. The specific epithet (buxifolium) means "box-tree leaved".

Distribution
Spyridium buxifolium occurs mainly in the upper Hunter Valley and nearby Howes Valley.

References

buxifolium
Rosales of Australia
Flora of New South Wales
Taxa named by Eduard Fenzl
Plants described in 1837